Ardro pri Raki is a small settlement east of Raka in the Municipality of Krško in eastern Slovenia. The area is part of the traditional region of Lower Carniola. It is now included with the rest of the municipality in the Lower Sava Statistical Region.

Name
Ardro pri Raki was attested in historical sources as Redern in 1420 and Reder in 1433. The name of the settlement was changed from Ardro to Ardro pri Raki in 1953.

References

External links
Ardro pri Raki on Geopedia

Populated places in the Municipality of Krško